This is a list of Italian television related events from 2005.

Events
26 February - Actress and TV host Hoara Borselli and her partner Simone Di Pasquale win the first season of Ballando con le stelle.

Debuts

Domestic
8 January - Ballando con le stelle (2005–present)

International
October -  BB3B (Disney Channel) (2005)

Television shows

RAI

Miniseries 

 La maledizione dei templari (The Templars’ curse) – by Josée Dayan, from Maurice Druon’s The accursed kings, with Jeanne Moreau, Gerard Depardieu and Luca Barbareschi; 5 episodes. Coproduced with France and Romania.

Variety 

 Bla bla bla – fake talk-show, (actually, a demented parody of the genre) hosted by Lilo and Greg.

Mediaset
Grande Fratello (2000–present)

Ending this year

Births

Deaths

See also
List of Italian films of 2005

References